Vakkalathu Narayanankutty is a 2001 Indian Malayalam-language legal comedy-drama film co-written and directed by T. K. Rajeev Kumar, starring Jayaram, Mukesh, Manya and Jagathy Sreekumar. It was actor Bobby Kottarakkara's last film. It was during the shooting of this film that Bobby Kottarakkara died, leaving the team to continue the shooting without him. The film had an average performance at the box office.

Plot

The film presents the story of Narayanankutty, popularly known as Vakkaalaththu Narayanankutty, an orthodox person and an active social worker who can bear anything but breach of justice and traditionalism. When he sees law being broken anywhere, he reacts promptly. He doesn't even care as to who is pitted against him and just goes on fighting. This leads to all sorts of problems in his life and the film follows that.

The film is loosely based on the noted social activist, Nawab Rajendran.

Cast
 Jayaram as Vakkalathu Narayanankutty
 Mukesh as Adv. Mathew Chandy Neruparambil
 Manya as Kukku Kurian
 Jagathy Sreekumar as Advocate Easwara Subramoni Iyer
 K.B. Ganesh Kumar as Raghu 
 Kalabhavan Mani as S.I. 'Minnal' Chandran
 Bobby Kottarakkara as Captain Bobby
 Nandhu
 P. Balachandran as Padmanabhan, Narayanankutty's father
 Roslin as Narayanankutty's mother
 Rajan P. Dev as DGP Kurian Kulapurayil IPS, Kukku's father
 Shalu Menon as Niveditha, Narayanankutty's sister
 Ponnamma Babu as Kukku's Mother
 Raghavan as Judge
 Professor Aliyar
 P. Sreekumar as Sasidhara Kurup
 Poojappura Radhakrishnan
 Adv. Jayaprakash Kottarakara as Cameo Appearance
 Viji Thampi as Cameo Appearance
 Kalliyoor Sasi as Prof. Narayanan Potty

References

External links
 

2000s Malayalam-language films
Films scored by Mohan Sithara